Huang Kecheng (October 1, 1902 – December 28, 1986) was a senior general (大将) in the People's Liberation Army.

Biography 
Huang Kecheng was born in Yongxing, Hunan Province, and he was the third of four children. His father was Huang Qingzhu (黄清主), and his mother was Deng Longtao (邓龙桃). His family owned six mu of land.  Since he was not the eldest son, his parents did not consider it a great priority to provide a good education for him. He worked as a farm labourer on his family land, and completed high school when he turned 20, in 1920, from the Hunan 3rd Normal School. Huang eventually joined Chiang Kai-shek's National Revolutionary Army, and he joined the Communist Party of China in 1925.

In 1929, Huang was serving under Peng Dehuai in a Kuomintang regiment stationed in northern Hunan. When Peng rebelled in June 1928, Huang joined him. Huang led the Yongxing campaign during Xiangnan (South Hunan) campaign in 1928, and participated major battles encountered by the Red Army Third Division. Huang participated in the Long March, and, upon arrival on northern Shaanxi, he was promoted to be the director of the general political and organizational department. In the beginning of the Second Sino-Japan War, he was the political commissar of 344 brigade, affiliated with the 115 division of Eighth Route Army. His army accompanied Xu Haidong, fighting in regions across Shanxi, Hebei and Henan. After 1940, he became a political commissar in the Eighth Route Army and the New Fourth Army, and later the deputy and logistics commander of Northeastern Democratic Alliance Army.

After the founding of the People's Republic of China in 1949, Huang was appointed governor of Tianjin. He later became the state secretary of Hunan, the Commander of Hunan Military Region and its political commissar, the deputy director of the chief staff and director of general logistics, the deputy minister of national defense, the secretary general of the Central Military Commission, and the chief of staff of the PLA. He was made a senior general in 1955, and awarded the Army Medal, the Order of Independence and Freedom Medal, and the Order of Liberation. He was an alternate and then formal member of the 7th CPC Central Committee, and a member of the 8th Central Committee.

In 1959, Huang criticized the "Great Leap Forward" and "People's Communes" and was denounced as a member of an "Anti-Party group" associated with Peng Dehuai when Peng was criticized at the Mountain Lu Conference. He was deprived of all positions and was placed under investigation. He was partially rehabilitated, but was denounced and persecuted by Red Guards when the Cultural Revolution began in 1966.

In 1977, after Deng Xiaoping came to power, Huang was politically rehabilitated. After being recalled to service, he was appointed as adviser to the Central Military Commission, and executive secretary of the Central Commission for Discipline Inspection. He was selected as central committee member again in 1978.

He died on December 28, 1986, in Beijing.

References

Citations

Sources 
 Domes, Jurgen. Peng Te-huai: The Man and the Image, London: C. Hurst & Company. 1985. .

Members of the Secretariat of the Chinese Communist Party
People's Liberation Army Chiefs of General Staff
Victims of the Cultural Revolution
1902 births
1986 deaths
Politicians from Chenzhou
People's Liberation Army generals from Hunan
Chinese Communist Party politicians from Hunan
People's Republic of China politicians from Hunan
Political office-holders in Hunan
Political office-holders in Tianjin
People's Liberation Army General Logistics Department
Deputy Ministers of National Defense of the People's Republic of China
Burials at Babaoshan Revolutionary Cemetery